Edward Broughton (9 February 1925 – September 2016) was an English professional footballer who played as a winger.

Career
Born in Bradford, Broughton began his career at hometown club Bradford City, making one appearance in the FA Cup for them. He later played for New Brighton and Crystal Palace, making a total of 100 appearances in the Football League, before retiring due to injury.

References

External links
Broughton at holmesdale.net

1925 births
2016 deaths
Footballers from Bradford
English footballers
Association football wingers
Bradford City A.F.C. players
New Brighton A.F.C. players
Crystal Palace F.C. players
English Football League players